Florentina (minor planet designation: 321 Florentina) is a typical Main belt asteroid.

It was discovered by Johann Palisa on 15 October 1891 in Vienna. He named the asteroid for his daughter, Florentine. Between 1874 and 1923, Palisa discovered a total of 122 asteroids.

A group of astronomers, including Lucy d'Escoffier Crespo da Silva, contributed data toward the discovery of spin-vector alignments in the Koronis family, which includes (321) Florentina. This was based on observations made between 1998 through 2000. The collaborative work resulted in the creation of 61 new individual rotation lightcurves to augment previous published observations.

References

External links 
 Lightcurve plot of 321 Florentina, Palmer Divide Observatory, B. D. Warner (1999)
 Asteroid Lightcurve Database (LCDB), query form (info )
 Dictionary of Minor Planet Names, Google books
 Asteroids and comets rotation curves, CdR – Observatoire de Genève, Raoul Behrend
 Discovery Circumstances: Numbered Minor Planets (1)-(5000) – Minor Planet Center
 
 

000321
Discoveries by Johann Palisa
Named minor planets
000321
000321
18911015